The canton of Montrevel-en-Bresse is a former administrative division in eastern France. It was disbanded following the French canton reorganisation which came into effect in March 2015. It consisted of 14 communes, which joined the new canton of Attignat in 2015. It had 17,145 inhabitants (2012).

The canton comprised 14 communes:

Attignat
Béréziat
Confrançon
Cras-sur-Reyssouze
Curtafond
Étrez
Foissiat
Jayat
Malafretaz
Marsonnas
Montrevel-en-Bresse
Saint-Didier-d'Aussiat
Saint-Martin-le-Châtel
Saint-Sulpice

Demographics

See also
Cantons of the Ain department

References

Former cantons of Ain
2015 disestablishments in France
States and territories disestablished in 2015